Albanus Glacier, also known as Phillips Glacier, is a  long glacier flowing west along the south side of Tapley Mountains to enter Scott Glacier just north of Mount Zanuck, in the Queen Maud Mountains in Antarctica. It was discovered in December 1934 by the Byrd Antarctic Expedition geological party under Quin Blackburn. Byrd named it for Albanus Phillips, Jr., president of Phillips Packing in Cambridge, Maryland, a patron of, and supplier of provisions to, his Antarctic expeditions of 1928–30 and 1933–35.

See also
 List of glaciers in the Antarctic
 Glaciology

References

 

Glaciers of Amundsen Coast
Queen Maud Mountains